Demerick Montae "Erick" Strickland (born November 25, 1973) is an American professional basketball player formerly in the National Basketball Association (NBA).

Born in Opelika, Alabama, Strickland attended Bellevue West High School in Bellevue, Nebraska, then played his college basketball career at the University of Nebraska. He was the 2nd all time scorer for Class A Nebraska basketball. He later played for the New York Knicks, Vancouver Grizzlies, Boston Celtics, Indiana Pacers and Milwaukee Bucks, averaging 7.5 points per game throughout his nine-year NBA career.

Strickland also played two seasons of minor league baseball. He played in the Gulf Coast League with the Gulf Coast Marlins in 1992 and in the New York–Penn League with the Elmira Pioneers in 1993. Despite being a full two years younger than the average batter in his league in 1993, he led the Pioneers in triples and finished second in stolen bases and bases on balls.

Career statistics

NBA

Regular season

|-
| align="left" | 1996–97
| align="left" | Dallas
| 28 || 15 || 27.1 || .398 || .304 || .813 || 3.2 || 2.4 || 1.0 || 0.2 || 10.6
|-
| align="left" | 1997–98
| align="left" | Dallas
| 67 || 19 || 22.5 || .357 || .294 || .774 || 2.4 || 2.5 || 0.8 || 0.1 || 7.6
|-
| align="left" | 1998–99
| align="left" | Dallas
| 33 || 2 || 17.2 || .403 || .305 || .815 || 2.5 || 1.9 || 1.2 || 0.1 || 7.5
|-
| align="left" | 1999–00
| align="left" | Dallas
| 68 || 67 || 29.8 || .433 || .392 || .831 || 4.8 || 3.1 || 1.5 || 0.2 || 12.8
|-
| align="left" | 2000–01
| align="left" | New York
| 28 || 0 || 15.0 || .305 || .340 || .857 || 1.9 || 1.0 || 0.8 || 0.0 || 4.3
|-
| align="left" | 2000–01
| align="left" | Vancouver
| 22 || 0 || 18.6 || .301 || .292 || .863 || 3.5 || 3.0 || 1.0 || 0.0 || 6.4
|-
| align="left" | 2001–02
| align="left" | Boston
| 79 || 4 || 20.8 || .389 || .385 || .845 || 2.7 || 2.3 || 0.7 || 0.0 || 7.7
|-
| align="left" | 2002–03
| align="left" | Indiana
| 71 || 10 || 18.0 || .429 || .388 || .805 || 2.0 || 2.9 || 0.5 || 0.1 || 6.5
|-
| align="left" | 2003–04
| align="left" | Milwaukee
| 43 || 0 || 13.3 || .403 || .439 || .863 || 1.7 || 2.1 || 0.6 || 0.0 || 5.4
|-
| align="left" | 2004–05
| align="left" | Milwaukee
| 62 || 5 || 16.4 || .375 || .253 || .813 || 1.7 || 1.9 || 0.5 || 0.0 || 4.9
|- class="sortbottom"
| style="text-align:center;" colspan="2"| Career
| 501 || 122 || 20.3 || .392 || .351 || .826 || 2.6 || 2.4 || 0.8 || 0.1 || 7.5
|}

Playoffs

|-
| align="left" | 2001–02
| align="left" | Boston
| 12 || 0 || 9.8 || .282 || .200 || 1.000 || 1.1 || 1.4 || 0.4 || 0.1 || 2.9
|-
| align="left" | 2002–03
| align="left" | Indiana
| 5 || 0 || 8.4 || .429 || .200 || .800 || 1.4 || 1.6 || 0.2 || 0.0 || 4.2
|-
| align="left" | 2003–04
| align="left" | Milwaukee
| 3 || 0 || 13.7 || .417 || .000 || 1.000 || 1.7 || 3.0 || 0.7 || 0.0 || 4.7
|- class="sortbottom"
| style="text-align:center;" colspan="2"| Career
| 20 || 0 || 10.1 || .338 || .167 || .913 || 1.3 || 1.7 || 0.4 || 0.1 || 3.5
|}

College

|-
| align="left" | 1992–93
| align="left" | Nebraska
| 31 || 6 || 17.2 || .454 || .364 || .729 || 2.0 || 2.1 || 1.5 || 0.1 || 7.8
|-
| align="left" | 1993–94
| align="left" | Nebraska
| 30 || 13 || 22.4 || .423 || .350 || .811 || 3.4 || 3.2 || 2.0 || 0.4 || 10.7
|-
| align="left" | 1994–95
| align="left" | Nebraska
| 31 || 31 || 30.4 || .444 || .338 || .727 || 5.4 || 4.3 || 2.9 || 0.2 || 16.3
|-
| align="left" | 1995–96
| align="left" | Nebraska
| 35 || 34 || 31.1 || .436 || .351 || .823 || 4.9 || 3.4 || 1.7 || 0.3 || 14.7
|- class="sortbottom"
| style="text-align:center;" colspan="2"| Career
| 127 || 84 || 25.5 || .439 || .349 || .776 || 4.0 || 3.3 || 2.0 || 0.3 || 12.5
|}

References

External links
 NBA.com - Erick Strickland Profile
 basketballreference.com: Erick Strickland NBA statistics

1973 births
Living people
African-American basketball players
American expatriate basketball people in Canada
American men's basketball players
Basketball players from Alabama
Boston Celtics players
Dallas Mavericks players
Indiana Pacers players
Milwaukee Bucks players
Nebraska Cornhuskers men's basketball players
New York Knicks players
People from Opelika, Alabama
People from Bellevue, Nebraska
Point guards
Quad City Thunder players
Shooting guards
Undrafted National Basketball Association players
Vancouver Grizzlies players
21st-century African-American sportspeople
20th-century African-American sportspeople
Gulf Coast Marlins players
Elmira Pioneers players
African-American baseball players
Baseball players from Alabama
Baseball players from Nebraska